Type II inositol-1,4,5-trisphosphate 5-phosphatase is an enzyme that in humans is encoded by the INPP5B gene.

Cellular calcium signaling is controlled by the production of inositol phosphates (IPs) by phospholipase C in response to extracellular signals. The IP signaling molecules are inactivated by a family of inositol polyphosphate-5-phosphatases (5-phosphatases). This gene encodes the type II 5-phosphatase. The protein is localized to the cytosol and mitochondria, and associates with membranes through an isoprenyl modification near the C-terminus. Several alternatively spliced transcript variants of this gene have been described, but the full-length nature of some of these variants has not been determined.

References

Further reading